Ugo Poletti (19 April 1914 – 25 February 1997) was an Italian cardinal of the Roman Catholic Church who served as Vicar General of Rome from 1973 to 1991, and was elevated to the cardinalate in 1973.

Biography
Born in Omegna, Poletti studied at the seminary in Novara before being ordained to the priesthood on 29 June 1938. He then served as vice-rector of the theological seminary and bursar of the general diocesan seminary in Novara until 1946. After a period of pastoral work from 1946 to 1951, Poletti was made Pro-Vicar General of Novara in 1954, and on 16 June 1955 a Protonotary Apostolic.

On 12 July 1958, Poletti was appointed Auxiliary Bishop of Novara and Titular Bishop of Medeli. He received his episcopal consecration on the following 14 September from Archbishop Vincenzo Gremigni, MSC, with Bishops Mario Longo Dorni and Francesco Brustia serving as co-consecrators. Poletti attended the Second Vatican Council from 1962 to 1965, and was later named Archbishop of Spoleto on 26 June 1967. Pope Paul VI made him Titular Archbishop of Aemona and Second Vicegerent of Rome on 3 July 1969, and then Pro-Vicar General of Rome on 13 October 1972. He was also president of Pontifical Mission Aid Societies (1964–1967), a member of the Congregation for Divine Worship and the Discipline of the Sacraments, and was President of Pontifical Works and of the Liturgical Academy.

Poletti was created Cardinal-Priest of Ss. Ambrogio e Carlo by Pope Paul in the consistory of 5 March 1973, in advance for his appointment as Vicar General of Rome, and also Archpriest of the Lateran Basilica, on 26 March of that same year. As Vicar General, Poletti administered the diocese in the name of the Pope, who is the Bishop of the diocese of Rome.

One of the cardinal electors who participated in the conclaves of August and October 1978, Poletti is believed to have received up to thirty votes during a ballot of the latter conclave. Earlier, in July 1976, the newsletter Bulletin de l'Occident Chrétien had claimed that Poletti himself, among other high-ranking Church officials, was a Freemason, having been initiated on 17 February 1969, with the Masonic code name of "Upo". According to David Yallop, in his 1984 book In God's Name, it was because of these alleged Masonic connections that Pope John Paul I had planned on transferring Poletti as Archbishop of Florence. From 1985 to 1991, he was President of the Italian Episcopal Conference.

Upon his resignation as Cardinal Vicar on 17 January 1991, he was made Archpriest of the Liberian Basilica. In that same year, he allegedly authorized the interment of gangster Enrico De Pedis in the crypt of Sant'Apollinare alle Terme Neroniane-Alessandrine Church in Rome.

Cardinal Poletti died from a heart attack in Rome, at age 82. He is buried in the chapel of Santa Lucia in the Liberian Basilica.

References

External links
Vatican
Catholic-Hierarchy
Cardinals of the Holy Roman Church

1914 births
1997 deaths
20th-century Italian cardinals
Participants in the Second Vatican Council
20th-century Italian Roman Catholic archbishops
Archbishops of Spoleto
Apostolic pronotaries
Cardinal Vicars
Cardinals created by Pope Paul VI